Gérard Christaud-Pipola (born 18 April 1947) is a French bobsledder. He competed at the 1968, 1972, 1976 and the 1984 Winter Olympics.

References

1947 births
Living people
French male bobsledders
Olympic bobsledders of France
Bobsledders at the 1968 Winter Olympics
Bobsledders at the 1972 Winter Olympics
Bobsledders at the 1976 Winter Olympics
Bobsledders at the 1984 Winter Olympics
People from Voiron
Sportspeople from Isère